Arnica cernua is a species of arnica known by the common name serpentine arnica. It is native to the Klamath Mountains of northern California and southern Oregon, where it is a member of the serpentine soils flora.

This is a perennial herb growing one or more green to purplish stems up to about 30 centimeters tall. There are 3 or 4 pairs of leaves on long petioles. The blade is oval to spade-shaped and may be several centimeters long. The inflorescence contains one or more hairy, glandular, daisylike flower heads, each with a center of yellowish disc florets and a fringe of yellow ray florets which approach 3 centimeters in maximum length.

The fruit is a cylindrical achene about 7 millimeters long which is covered in stiff hairs and has a white pappus at one end.

References

External links
Jepson Manual Treatment
Calphotos Photo gallery, University of California

cernua
Flora of California
Flora of Oregon
Plants described in 1900
Flora of the Klamath Mountains
Flora without expected TNC conservation status